Mahesh Prabhakar Choughule is an Indian politician and member of the Bharatiya Janata Party. He is been elected two times as MLA for Bhiwandi secured the seat for BJP in minority populated area. He is a second term member of the Maharashtra Legislative Assembly.

Constituency
Mahesh Prabhakar Choughule was elected from the Bhiwandi West Assembly Constituency Maharashtra.

Positions held 
Maharashtra Legislative Assembly MLA.
Terms in office: 2014–2019.2019- till now

References 

Bharatiya Janata Party politicians from Maharashtra
Maharashtra MLAs 2014–2019
Living people
Marathi politicians
Politics of Thane district
Year of birth missing (living people)